Monuments of National Importance in Uttar Pradesh. This is a list of Monuments of National Importance (ASI) as officially recognized by and available through the website of the Archaeological Survey of India in the Indian state Uttar Pradesh. The monument identifier is a combination of the abbreviation of the subdivision of the list (state, ASI circle) and the numbering as published on the website of the ASI. 741 Monuments of National Importance have been recognized by the ASI in Uttar Pradesh.''

List of monuments 
Uttar Pradesh is subdivided into three circles:

 Agra
 List of Monuments of National Importance in Agra district
 List of Monuments of National Importance in Agra circle
 Lucknow
 List of Monuments of National Importance in Lucknow circle
 List of Monuments of National Importance in Lalitpur district
 List of Monuments of National Importance in Lucknow circle/North
 List of Monuments of National Importance in Lucknow circle/South
 Patna circle
 List of Monuments of National Importance in Patna circle in Uttar Pradesh

See also 
 List of Monuments of National Importance in India for other Monuments of National Importance in India
 List of State Protected Monuments in Uttar Pradesh

References 

Uttar Pradesh